Tilly of Bloomsbury may refer to:

 Tilly of Bloomsbury (play), a 1919 play by Ian Hay
 Tilly of Bloomsbury (1921 film) directed by Rex Wilson
 Tilly of Bloomsbury (1931 film) directed by Jack Raymond
 Tilly of Bloomsbury (1940 film) directed by Leslie S. Hiscot